Sri Lanka participated at the 2019 Summer Universiade which was held in Napoli, Italy. Sri Lanka sent a delegation consisting of 72 competitors for the event including 25 track and field athletes.

Sri Lanka didn't win any medal in the multi-sport event.

References

External links 

 Official site of Naples 2019

Nations at the 2019 Summer Universiade
Summer U
Sri Lanka at the Summer Universiade